Shane Barrett (born 2001) is an Irish hurler who plays as a right corner-forward for club side Blarney and at inter-county level with the Cork senior hurling team.

Career

Blarney

Barrett joined the Blarney club at a young age and played in all grades at juvenile and underage levels. On 21 April 2019, he made his championship debut and scored five points from play in a 0-24 to 2-12 defeat of Ballinhassig. On 3 October 2020, Barrett scored two points from play when Blarney secured the Premier Intermediate Championship title after defeating Castlelyons by 1-20 to 0-15 in the final.

Cork

Under-17, minor and under-20

Barrett first lined out for Cork as a member of the county's under-17 team during the 2017 Munster Championship. On 25 April 2017, he won a Munster Championship medal after a 3-13 to 1-12 defeat of Waterford in the final. Barrett came on as a substitute for Blake Murphy in Cork's 1-19 to 1-17 All-Ireland final defeat of Dublin at Croke Park on 6 August 2017.

After an unsuccessful season as captain of the Cork minor team in 2018, Barrett was drafted onto the Cork under-20 team in 2020. He won a Munster Championship title that year after scoring four points from play in the 1-16 to 1-14 defeat of Tipperary in the final.

Career statistics

Club

Inter-county

Honours

Blarney
Cork Premier Intermediate Hurling Championship: 2020

Cork
All-Ireland Under-20 Hurling Championship: 2020
Munster Under-20 Hurling Championship: 2020
All-Ireland Under-17 Hurling Championship: 2017
Munster Under-17 Hurling Championship: 2017

References

2001 births
Living people
Blarney hurlers
Cork inter-county hurlers
Hurling forwards